Maharajadhiraja Raj Rajeshwar Sawai Shri Sir Shivaji Rao Holkar Bahadur XII (Indore, 11 November 1859 – Maheshwar, 13 October 1908) was the Maharaja of Indore (Holkar State) belonging to the Holkar dynasty of the Marathas. He was the son of Tukojirao Holkar II and Maharani Shrimant Akhand Soubhagyavati Parvati Bai Sahib. He was educated at the Daly College, Indore, a school in central India along with the rulers of the Ratlam State, Dewas Sr. State & other Thakurs of the princely states in Madhya Bharat.

Life
He succeeded his father when he died on 17 June 1886. He visited England in 1887 to attend the celebrations of the golden wedding of the queen-empress, and was made Knight Grand Commander of the Order of the Star of India on 20 June 1887.

His administration was poor. The resident had been separately removed from Indore since 1854, but since 1899 the British appointed a new resident specific for better oversight of the state.  The currency of the state was replaced in 1902 by the currency of British India.

He abdicated on 31 January 1903 in favour of his son Tukojirao Holkar III, (born in 1890) .

In 1865 he married Maharani Shrimant Akhand Soubhagyavati Girja Bai Sahib Holkar, later Maharani Shrimant Akhand Soubhagyavati Varanasi Bai Sahib Holkar, Shrimant Maharani Sahib Akhand Soubhagyavati Chandrabhaga Bai Holkar, Maharani Sita Bai Soubhagyavati Shrimant Akhand Sahib Holkar.

He died at Maheshwar on 13 October 1908. He had two sons and six daughters.

Honours
Knight Grand Commander of the Order of the Indian Empire (GCIE), 1887
Queen Victoria Golden Jubilee Medal, 1887

See also

Holkar

References

1859 births
1908 deaths
Indian knights
Maharajas of Indore
Knights Grand Commander of the Order of the Star of India
Monarchs who abdicated